Silvia Ester Gallego de Soto (born 1948) is a former Argentine Senator for La Pampa Province. She is a member of the Justicialist Party. She was part of the majority Front for Victory parliamentary group, supporting the national government of President Néstor Kirchner. Her term expired December 10, 2009 and she was appointed a director of the state-owned bank Banco de la Nación Argentina afterwards.

External links
Senate profile

References

Living people
1948 births
People from General Pico
Members of the Argentine Senate for La Pampa
Justicialist Party politicians
Women members of the Argentine Senate